Mirim Lee (born 25 October 1990), also known as Lee Mi-rim, is a South Korean professional golfer.

Lee turned professional in 2009. She has played on the LPGA of Korea Tour since 2010 and has won three events on that tour. She began playing on the U.S.-based LPGA Tour in 2014 and has won four tournaments, including one major, the 2020 ANA Inspiration. In the first round of the 2016 Women's British Open, Lee tied the low-round record in a Women's British Open of 62.

Professional wins (8)

LPGA Tour wins (4)

LPGA Tour playoff record (2–1)

LPGA of Korea Tour wins (3)

Ladies Asian Golf Tour wins (1)

Major championships

Wins (1)

1 Defeated Henderson and Korda in a sudden-death playoff: Lee (4), Henderson (5) and Korda (5).

Results timeline
Results not in chronological order before 2019 or in 2020.

CUT = missed the half-way cut
NT = no tournament
WD = withdrew
T = tied

Summary

 Most consecutive cuts made – 6 (2014 WPC – 2015 Evian)
 Longest streak of top-10s – 1 (six times)

References

External links

Profile on LPGA of Korea Tour site 

Seoul Sisters profile

South Korean female golfers
LPGA Tour golfers
LPGA of Korea Tour golfers
Winners of LPGA major golf championships
1990 births
Living people